NBA Jam is an American-Philippine television series that ran on Solar Sports, RPN and Basketball TV from 1995 to 2007.

Synopsis

Hosted by Vito Lazatin and Reema Chanco, NBA Jam contained segments produced by the NBA and locally by Basketball TV.

Segments
 NBA SpotLight
 Total NBA
 Retro NBA
 Jam of the Week
 NBA All-Access
 NBA Shorts
 NBA School (2005–2006, for the Philippine edition)
 NBA Trivia Question (for the Philippine edition)
 On the Scene (for the US Edition)
 NBA Tour (for the US Edition)
 Young Stars (for the US Edition)

Jammers

USA edition 
 Jam (character) (1996-1997)
 Ian Eagle announcer (1996–2002)

Philippine edition
 George Rocha (2003–2005)
 Vitto Lazatin (2003–2007)
 Reema Chanco (2005–2007)

References

Jam
1995 American television series debuts
2003 Philippine television series debuts
2002 American television series endings
2007 Philippine television series endings
1990s American television series
2000s American television series
First-run syndicated television programs in the United States
Radio Philippines Network original programming
Philippine sports television series